Telephone numbers in Vatican City are integrated into the Italian telephone numbering plan. The International Telecommunication Union (ITU) has assigned country code 379 to Vatican City, but it is not in use.

Vatican telephone numbers are in the form 06698xxxxx, where 06 the area code for Rome, which surrounds Vatican City.  For dialing calls within Vatican City or to Italian destinations the area code must be dialed.

The telecommunications provider of Vatican City is the Vatican Telephone Service (part of the Governorate's Department of Telecommunications since 2002).

See also 

 Telephone numbers in Italy
 Telephone numbers in San Marino
 Index of Vatican City-related articles

References

Communications in Vatican City
Vatican City
Telephone numbers in Italy
Telephone numbers